Phorica is a monotypic moth genus of the family Erebidae. Its only species, Phorica phasipennis, is found in India, Peninsular Malaysia, Sumatra, Borneo and Sulawesi. Both the genus and species were first described by Francis Walker in 1858.

References

Calpinae
Monotypic moth genera